Ekinlik Island, formerly Koutalis is an island situated off the Turkish coast, in the Sea of Marmara. Administratively the island belongs to Marmara town, the central settlement of Marmara Island in Balikesir Province of Turkey. The island has 2.47 km2 land area, one village under the same name with the island and 102 population according to the census in 2014.

History
According to Hititian sources Marmara Archipelago and surrounding area was belong to the Luwian peoples in 1000 BC's, while the Greek-speaking people of the region settled during the 7th century BC to colonize the islands. The oldest records specifically on Ekinlik Island belong to the 14th century during Byzantine period, saying that the Catalan mercenaries captured the islandIn the 15th century the island passed under Ottoman rule. In the 17th century, according to the Geographer Athenian Meletios, the island was named as Koutali, and this name was used until 1923. In 1923, as a result of the Lausanne Treaty signed between Turkey and Greece the island's Greek-speaking people migrated to Greece and the United States and the settlement was placed with the people migrated from the Black Sea region of Turkey.

References

Islands of the Sea of Marmara
Islands of Turkey
Islands of Balıkesir Province